Wiegmann is the surname of:
 Arend Friedrich August Wiegmann (1802–1841), a German zoologist
 Arend Joachim Friedrich Wiegmann (1770–1853), a German pharmacist and botanist
 Bettina Wiegmann (born 1971), a German athlete
 Carl Arend Friedrich Wiegmann (1836–1901), a German malacologist
 Casey Wiegmann (born 1973), an American football player 
 Norman Arthur Wiegmann (1920–2001), an American mathematician and university professor
 Paul Wiegmann (born 1952), a Russian-American physicist and university professor 
 Sarina Wiegman (born 1969), Dutch footballer and football coach

Surnames